Marion Rothhaar (born December 18, 1972, in Zweibrücken, Rhineland-Palatinate, West Germany) is a retired German rhythmic gymnast.

She competed for West Germany in the rhythmic gymnastics all-around competition at the 1988 Summer Olympics in Seoul, placing 19th overall.

References

External links 
 

1972 births
Living people
German rhythmic gymnasts
Gymnasts at the 1988 Summer Olympics
Olympic gymnasts of Germany
People from Freudenstadt
Sportspeople from Karlsruhe (region)